The European Regions Airline Association is a trade association of European regional airlines and associated businesses. It was founded as the European Regional Airlines Association in 1980, by a small number of what were then known as commuter airlines. The association is registered in England and Wales.

History 

The European Regions Airline Association was founded as the European Regional Airlines Association in 1980, by a small number of what were then known as commuter airlines. The association is registered as a limited company in England and Wales, with an office in Brussels, Belgium.

Awards 
The association makes an annual regional "Airport of the Year" award, which in 2016 was given to Southampton Airport, in Hampshire in southern England.

References 

 
Airline trade associations
British companies established in 1980
Companies based in Surrey
Regional airlines